Parliamentary elections were held in Ukraine on 29 March 1998. The Communist Party of Ukraine remained the largest party in the Verkhovna Rada, winning 121 of the 445 seats.

After the election votes in five electoral districts had too many irregularities to declare a winner and the parliament was five members short of 450.

Electoral system
In comparison to the first parliamentary election, this time half of 450 parliament seats were filled by single-seat majority winners in 225 electoral regions (constituencies), and the other half were split among political parties and blocks that received at least 4% of the popular vote.

Results
The Communist Party of Ukraine was victorious in 18 regions including the city of Kyiv, while in three other regions the party finished in second place. The People's Movement of Ukraine (Rukh) won in five regions, all of them located in Western Ukraine and was a strong runner-up in three others, mostly in the west and Kyiv. The electoral block of Socialists and Peasants was able to secure a victory in only two regions, however it did finish strong in seven other regions across central Ukraine. The new and rising party of Hromada won the Dnipropetrovsk Region, while the Social-Democratic Party of Ukraine managed to secure the Zakarpattia Region.

Notable and strong runners up were the Party of Greens, the People's Democratic Party, the Progressive Socialist Party, the People's Party, Working Ukraine, the National Front and Our Ukraine.

By region (single constituency)

Crimea (10/10)
 No party affiliation: Serhiy Ivanov, Anatoliy Rakhansky, Valeriy Horbatov, Refat Chubarov, Anatoliy Franchuk
 Communist Party of Ukraine: Yevhen Leshan, Viktor Myronenko
 Soyuz: Lev Myrymsky
 People's Democratic Party of Ukraine: Ihor Franchuk, Valeriy Khoroshkovsky
Vinnytsia Region (8/8)
 No party affiliation: Petro Poroshenko (No.12), Oleh Yukhnovsky, Oleksandr Shpak, Yevhen Smirnov, Oleksandr Stoyan
 People's Democratic Party of Ukraine: Ihor Kvyatkovsky, Anatoliy Matviyenko
 Communist Party of Ukraine: Mykola Pasyeka
Volyn Region (4/5)
 National Front (Republican): Valeriy Dibrova
 Agrarian: Kateryna Vashchuk
 No party affiliation: Mykola Martynenko
 Democratic Party of Ukraine: Oleksandr Svyryda
 People's Democratic Party of Ukraine: Serhiy Shevchuk
Dnipropetrovsk Region (16/17)
 Hromada 6 (1-Independent)
 No party affiliation 5
 Communist 3
 Interregional bloc 1
 Agrarian 1
Donetsk Region (21/23)
 No party affiliation 12
 Communist 7
 Party of Regions 2
Zhytomyr Region (5/6)
 No party affiliation 2
 People-Democratic 1
 Communist 1
 Christian-Democratic 1
Zakarpattia Region (5/5)
 Social-Democratic (u) 3
 No party affiliation 2
Zaporizhia Region (7/9)
 No party affiliation 3
 Communist 3 (1-Independent)
 Agrarian 1
Ivano-Frankivsk Region (6/6)
 No party affiliation 2
 National Front 2 (all CUN)
 Labor and Liberal together 1 (Independent)
 Christian people 1
Kirovohrad Region (3/5)
 No party affiliation 3
Luhansk Region (12/12)
 Communist 8
 No party affiliation 4
Lviv Region (10/12)
 People's Movement 2
 Reforms and Order 2
 National Front 2 (all Independent)
 Fewer words 1
 No party affiliation 1
 Christian-Democratic 1
 Agrarian 1
Mykolaiv Region (3/6)
 No party affiliation 2
 Reforms and Order 1
Odessa Region (10/11)
 No party affiliation 6
 Communist 2
 Agrarian 1 (Independent)
 Social and Peasant 1
Kyiv Region (7/8)
 No party affiliation 4
 Social and Peasant 1 (Socialist)
 Agrarian 1
 People's Movement 1
Poltava Region (8/8)
 Communist 3
 No party affiliation 2
 People's Movement 1
 People-Democratic 1 (Independent)
 Forward 1 (Independent)
Rivne Region (5/5)
 People's Movement 3
 No party affiliation 2
Sumy Region (6/6)
 No party affiliation 2
 Progressive Socialist 2
 Communist 1
 Justice 1
Ternopil Region (4/5)
 People's Movement 2
 No party affiliation 1
 National Front 1 (CUN)
Kharkiv Region (12/14)
 No party affiliation 6
 Communist 2
 Agrarian 1
 Social and Peasant 1 (Independent)
 Progressive Socialist 1 (Independent)
 People-Democratic 1
Kherson Region (6/6)
 No party affiliation 2
 Hromada 1
 Communist 1
 Christian-Democratic 1
 Social and Peasant 1 (Socialist)
Khmelnytsky Region (7/7)
 No party affiliation 4
 Republican 1
 Socialist 1
 Communist 1
Cherkasy Region (7/7)
 No party affiliation 3
 Communist 2
 Social and Peasant 1 (Peasant)
 People-Democratic 1
Chernivtsi Region (4/4)
 No party affiliation 3
 People's Movement 1
Chernihiv Region (5/6)
 No party affiliation 4
 People-Democratic 1
Kyiv (11/12)
 No party affiliation 8
 Democratic Parties 1 (Independent)
 People's Movement 1
 Reforms and Order 1
Sevastopol (2/2)
 No party affiliation 1
 Communist 1

Party affiliation changes after the elections
The size of the factions created in parliament after the election fluctuated. By January 2000, the Progressive Socialist Party of Ukraine and Hromada had not had any deputies; while Peasant Party of Ukraine had deputies only in 1999. All these factions where disbanded due to the lack of members.

Party of Regional Revival of Ukraine (later to become the biggest party of Ukraine as Party of Regions) grew massively in parliament (after in March 2001 it united with four parties) from 2 deputies elected in this election to a faction of 24 people in July 2002 (one deputy left the faction later). Later to become second biggest party of Ukraine, Batkivshchyna, started its existence as a faction when in the spring of 1999 members of Hromada left their party to join other parliament factions, among them Yulia Tymoshenko who set up the parliamentary faction "Batkivshchyna" in March 1999.

People's Movement of Ukraine split into 2 different factions in the spring of 1999 (the largest membership of the breakaway faction led by Hennadiy Udovenko was 19 and ended with 14, the "other" faction ended with 23; meaning that 10 elected People's Movement of Ukraine deputies did not represent any segment of the party anymore by June 2002).

Other mayor "non-elected" factions/parties to emerge in parliament after the election were: Solidarity (27 to 20 members) and Labour Ukraine (38 members in June 2002); by June 2002 the parliament had 8 more factions then its original 8 in May 1998.

References

External links
Central Election Commission of Ukraine

Parliamentary elections in Ukraine
Parliamentary
Ukraine
Ukraine
3rd Ukrainian Verkhovna Rada